The 2022 NHRA Camping World Drag Racing Season was announced on September 16, 2021.

It was the 67th season of the National Hot Rod Association's top drag racing competition. The NHRA will have 22 Top Fuel and Funny Car events, 19 Pro Stock events, and 15 Pro Stock Motorcycle events.

Schedule
Schedule released September 16, 2021 (most recently revised June 16, 2022 with media rights and Pro Stock addition).

Additional rules for specially marked races
4 Lanes:  The Four-Wide Nationals in both Las Vegas and Charlotte in the spring will compete with cars on four lanes.
 All cars will qualify on each lane as all four lanes will be used in qualifying.
 Three rounds with cars using all four lanes.
 In Rounds One and Two, the top two drivers (of four) will advance to the next round.
 The pairings are set as follows:
 Race One:  1, 8, 9, 16
 Race Two:  4, 5, 12, 13
 Race Three:  2, 7, 10, 15
 Race Four:  3, 6, 11, 14
 Semifinal One:  Top two in Race One and Race Two
 Semifinal Two:  Top two in Race Three and Race Four
 Finals:  Top two in Semifinal One and Semifinal Two
 Lane choice determined by times in previous round.  In first round, lane choice determined by fastest times.
 Drivers who advance in Rounds One and Two will receive 20 points for each round advancement.
 In Round Three, the winner of the race will be declared the race winner and will collect 40 points.  The runner-up will receive 20 points.  Third and fourth place drivers will be credited as semifinal losers.

1.5:  The U. S. Nationals and Auto Club Finals will have their race points increased by 50% .  Drivers who qualify but are eliminated in the first round receive 30 points, and each round win is worth 30 points.  The top four receive 10, 9, 8, and 7 points, respectively, for qualifying positions, with the 5–6 drivers receiving 6 points, 7–8 drivers receiving 5 points, 9–12 receiving 4 points, and 13–16 receiving 3 points.  Also, the top four, not three, drivers after each session receive points for fastest times in each round (4-3-2-1).

MM:  Pro Stock Car at this event is a non-championship race with the Mountain Motor formula, where cars can use carburetors or electronic fuel injection, do not have an engine displacement limit, and weighs a minimum of 2,450 pounds, compared to the NHRA Pro Stock formula that features electronic fuel injection, a 500ci (8193cc) engine displacement limit, and 2,350 pounds weight.

References

External links
 Official website

 
NHRA Camping World Drag Racing Series
NHRA Camping World Drag Racing Series